The Law Society, University College Cork, is an academic student society at University College Cork (UCC). Amongst the society's core activities are hosting regular house debates and guest addresses, debating, representing the educational interests of its members, running various moot court competitions and organising a social calendar. The society hosts an annual law conference which is attended by students and local practitioners alike, and is responsible for the editing and publication of the Cork Online Law Review (COLR).

Activities

House meetings
As one of the two debating unions at University College Cork, the Society gathers regularly to debate topical motions relating to students and other topical issues of importance, and to hear addresses from notable guests. This is one of the oldest activities of the society and typically takes place on Wednesday evenings in the Kane building or another lecture theatre on campus. Guest speakers related to the topic are often invited to engage with the motion and address the students. Meetings such as the address by journalist Robert Fisk, have attracted a capacity crowd in UCC's largest lecture theatre. Notable figures to have spoken at House Meetings of the Society include then candidate for President of Ireland Michael D. Higgins, Taoiseach John A. Costello in 1956, then Fianna Fáil party whip Bertie Ahern, then Senator Mary Robinson in 1976, author and advocate for the legalisation of cannabis Howard Marks in 1997, talk-show hosts Ryan Tubridy and George Hook, prominent Queen's Counsel Michael Mansfield and members of the Irish judiciary.

Competitive debating
The history of debating at the Law Society can be traced back to its forefather, the Law Students' Debating Society – which contested debates with students of other institutions such as the King's Inns. In more recent times the Society has been successful at Irish intervarsity debating competitions, such as the Irish Mace Debating Championships, the John Smith Memorial Mace and the European Universities Debating Championship. From 27 December 2008 to 4 January 2010 the Law Society jointly hosted one of the largest annual international student events in the world, the World Universities Debating Championship with the UCC Philosophical Society.

Moot court
The Society has held an annual moot court competition since 2006/2007, named after sponsors Matheson Ormsby Prentice. The winners of the competition represent UCC at the National Moot Court Competition hosted by the Dublin University Law Society.

Education
In the area of education, the Law Society spearheaded a campaign by Irish law students – which culminated in a successful legal action – against changes to entry requirements by the Law Society of Ireland.

Origins
Each academic year of the society is referred to as a "session". As of 2009, the society was in its 80th session, suggesting that the society originated in 1929. However, the constitution submitted by the Law Society to the college authorities in 1950 was similar to a document entitled 'House Rules of the Law Students' Debating Society', which was submitted in 1928. Whatever the actual moment of genesis for the society as it exists today, it is likely that the Law Students' Debating Society and the Law Society ultimately coalesced.

Constitution and organisation
The Law Society is governed by a constitution which has existed in various guises throughout the history of the society, having been redrafted and amended over time. The constitution provides for a society consisting of a president, a patron, fellows, an auditor, an executive committee, sub-committees, "Honorary Life Members" and "Ordinary Members". The position of ex officio patron of the Law Society is vested in the office of Dean of the Faculty of Law.

The society is run by an Executive Committee consisting of 15 students, who are elected at either the end of the academic year or the beginning of the new academic year, depending on position.

The Chief Justice of the Supreme Court of Ireland, John L. Murray, said of the society in 2005,
"With alumni that have included such noted figures in public life as Jack Lynch and Gerald Goldberg, it is beyond question that the role the Law Society has played in the education of the students of U.C.C.'s Law Faculty has always been a significant one".

Publications
The Cork Online Law Review (COLR) is an online law journal, which was founded in 2002, and is associated with the society. The online journal has "links on the websites of [..] St Louis University, New York University and the Library of Congress in the United States". As of 2021, the journal was sponsored by Irish law firm Arthur Cox. The journal accepts submissions in Irish, English and French and grants prize money to medal recipients. Its articles are featured on the website of the Irish Legal Information Initiative. It is operated by students and on a non-profit basis, and, at the time of its creation, was "Ireland's only online law review to be run solely by law students".

References

External links
 Website of The Law Society, UCC
 Website of the Cork Online Law Review

Student debating societies
University College Cork
Student debating societies in Ireland